Armitage is a village in Staffordshire, England on the south side of the Trent and Mersey Canal south just outside of the market town of Rugeley and north of the city of Lichfield, and noteworthy for the Armitage Shanks sanitary porcelain factory. With the adjacent village of Handsacre, it forms the parish of Armitage with Handsacre. The area of Armitage with Handsacre had a population of 5,335 at the 2011 Census.

Amenities
Armitage has a variety of village amenities including a Londis, a fishing shop, a newspaper shop, and the Croft Primary School. Armitage is also the home of Armitage Shanks. Its parish church, St. John the Baptist church, is located at the north end of the village. The organ of St John the Baptist church is of particular interest due to its size, age and history. The organ was built in 1789 for nearby Lichfield Cathedral, but moved here in 1865, commissioned by the then organist Josiah Spode (IV) who resided at nearby Hawkesyard estate, also known as Spode House.

Etymology and location
The name comes from the Middle English Ermitage, meaning 'Hermitage', in turn derived from the Old French ermitage, from a tradition that a hermit lived between the church and the River Trent.
It does not appear in the Domesday Book, although Handsacre does.

Armitage is now part of Armitage with Handsacre, although this is due to growth—historically they were once separate villages. It lies close to Hill Ridware along with the Hamstall Ridware, Mavesyn Ridware, Pipe Ridware and Longdon. It lies close to the town of Rugeley and a few miles north of Lichfield. It is located on the West Coast Main Line, the nearest stop being Rugeley. With continuous growth in the area Armitage and Rugeley are growing closer together.

Robert Rock 
Robert Rock, a professional golfer, was born in Armitage in 1977, then grew up in nearby Rugeley.

See also
Listed buildings in Armitage with Handsacre

References

External links
 

Lichfield District
Villages in Staffordshire